Maddie Mortimer (born 1996) is a British novelist.

Writing
Mortimer has described her first novel, Maps of our spectacular bodies, as "an elegy to my mum and to our relationship". Her mother died of cancer in 2010 and the book centres on their relationship. This novel won the 2022 Desmond Elliott Prize, which is awarded for a debut novel published in the UK or Ireland. It was also shortlisted for the 2022 Goldsmiths Prize and longlisted for the 2022 Booker Prize.

Personal life 
She was born in 1996.

Selected publications

Awards 

Desmond Elliott Prize in 2022
Shortlisted for Goldsmiths Prize in 2022
Longlisted for 2022 Booker Prize

References 

1996 births
Living people
21st-century British novelists
Recipients of Desmond Elliott Prize
British women novelists